Ursicinus of Brescia was an Italian saint, and bishop of Brescia in Lombardy. He participated in the council of Sardica in 347, in which year he died; his shrine may still be seen.  His feast day is 1 December.

References

Sources
Entry at Patron Saints Index

347 deaths
4th-century Italian bishops
4th-century Christian saints
Bishops of Brescia
Italian saints
People from Brescia
Year of birth unknown
4th-century Romans